Diego Rafecas (Buenos Aires, 3 May 1970 – 18 April 2017) was an Argentine actor and director. known for Un Buda, a film that he directed and acted in.

Early life
Diego Rafecas was born on May 3, 1970 in Buenos Aires, Argentina. He started studying acting with Cristina Banegas, a well-known Argentine actress, when he was 17. Two years later he debuted as an actor in a play One Aspect directed by Banegas and written by Griselda Gambaro.

Later he obtained a BA in Philosophy from the University of Buenos Aires. At the same time he also began to study the Zen practice with Stephane Kosen Thibaut, a Dharma heir of Japanese Master Deshimaru.

Career
During his college years he made his first short film, The Good Life and kidnapping in digital format, co-directed with Paul Flehner and began studying film directing with Eduardo Milewics. Under his guidance, he wrote and directed  Living in New York, a short film that won major awards at festivals around the country.

He died on 18 April 2017, aged 46, from an illness that had kept him hospitalised.

Filmography
Director
El secuestro (2001) (Short) 
La buena vida (2002)
Vivir en Nueva York (2005)
A Buddha (2005)
Rodney (2008)
Paco (2009)
Cruzadas (2011)
Ley Primera (2017)

Actor
La buena vida (2002) (cortometraje)
Se me rompió el pantalón (2003) (cortometraje)
Vivir en Nueva York (2005)
A Buddha (2005)
Cartas (2006)
Rodney (2008)
Paco (2009)
Cruzadas (2011)
Ley Primera (2017)

References

External links
 
 Diego Rafecas at cinenacional.com

1970 births
2017 deaths
Male actors from Buenos Aires
Argentine film directors
Argentine male film actors